Muthoot Technopolis is an information technology park at Kochi, India. It is the Plot #1 in CSEZ

Muthoot Pappachan Group is planning on expansion in Kochi with phase II of the project and further developments in the vicinity. Muthoot also  runs the Muthoot ceramics which is behind the Muthoot Technolpolis in Cochin Special Economic Zone, though CSEZ area is separated with Technopolis by wall.

See also
 Economy of Kochi
 Cochin Special Economic Zone

References

Economy of Kochi
Software technology parks in Kerala